José Melo de Oliveira (born September 26, 1946) is a Brazilian politician and was governor of state of Amazonas, Brazil.

Melo graduated with a degree in economics from the Federal University of Amazonas in 1967. He began public life while still at the university, where he served in various roles, including as a typist, director of the Department of Education and Sports, Subrector for Academic Affairs, and as a member of the University Council. Later, he worked as a teacher of history at Estelita Tapajós High School in Manaus. He also taught at the former Federal Technical School of Amazonas, and was a professor at the Federal University of Amazonas between 1970 and 1984. He won the election for Governor of the state of Amazonas in 2014 as a member of the Republican Party of the Social Order. His predecessor in the role, Omar Aziz, instead ran for a position in the Senate in the 2014 general elections.

References

1946 births
Living people
Governors of Amazonas (Brazilian state)
Vice Governors of Amazonas (Brazilian state)
Members of the Legislative Assembly of Amazonas
People from Amazonas (Brazilian state)
Federal University of Amazonas alumni